Nayyapudai (Strike Hard Evil/Obstacle) is a 2016 Tamil action thriller film directed by Vijay Kiran. The film stars S. A. Chandrasekhar, Pa. Vijay,  M. S. Bhaskar and Chandini Tamilarasan in the leading roles. The film began production during November 2015, and was released in February 2016.

Plot

Vellaichamy (S. A. Chandrasekhar) is a retired army professional who lives individually in Chennai and takes care of the children from the impoverished families of the neighborhood. With his brave act he saves a public bus taken hostage by the accomplices of a don who has been arrested for smuggling redstanders.

The old man gives refuge to Vijay (Pa. Vijay) a reporter in a prominent Tamil news channel and (Chandini Tamilarasan), as they have eloped as a couple.
Meanwhile, Vellaichamy crosses swords with the local don (Rajendran) by wreaking havoc to some of his criminal activities and a corrupt police officer (M. S. Bhaskar) who is loyal to the don.

The rest is how Vellaichamy with the help of Vijay takes on the dreadful don and uses the corrupt police officer for that.

Cast

S. A. Chandrasekhar as Vellaichamy
Pa. Vijay as  Vijay
Chandini Tamilarasan as Reporter
M. S. Bhaskar as Satyamurthy
Rajendran as Baby Anaconda
Aadukalam Naren as Karthikeyan
Viji Chandrasekhar
C. Ranganathan
Krishnamoorthy
Mippu 
'Salim' Ashmitha
Raandilya

Production
The project materialised in late 2015 with Kalaipuli S. Thanu offering young director, Vijaya Kiran, the opportunity to make his first film. Pa. Vijay, Chandini Tamilarasan and S. A. Chandrasekhar signed on to play the lead roles. Chandrasekhar revealed he would portray a 70-year-old character in the film and would be a disciplinarian who works with Vijay, who appears as a journalist. The film was launched in December 2015 at Prasad Labs and filming started thereafter, with the team releasing promotional stills in early 2016. Prior to the release of the film, S. Thanu sold his rights to Cosmo Village, while 6Face Studios were announced as the sole producer.

Soundtrack
The songs of this movie were composed by Taj Noor.

Release
The film opened to mixed reviews from critics, with a reviewer from Indiaglitz.com adding it is "an uninspiring film saved to an extent by SAC's acting". Subsequently, the film did not perform well at the box office and took a poor opening in Chennai in its opening weekend.

References

External links

2016 films
2010s Tamil-language films